The 2011 NHRA Full Throttle Drag Racing Season began on 24 February 2011 and concluded on 13 November. This race season marked the 60th anniversary of NHRA as an official motorsports sanctioning body.

There were 22 Top Fuel, Funny Car, and Pro Stock car events, and 16 Pro Stock Motorcycle events.

Schedule

NOTE: All races will be televised on ESPN or ESPN2.

1 The rules for the VisitMyrtleBeach.com 4 Wide Nationals differ from other races:
 All cars will qualify on each lane as all four lanes will be used in qualifying.
 Three rounds with cars using all four lanes.
 In Rounds One and Two, the top two drivers (of four) will advance to the next round.
 The pairings are set as follows:
 Race One:  1, 8, 9, 16
 Race Two:  4, 5, 12, 13
 Race Three:  2, 7, 10, 15
 Race Four:  3, 6, 11, 14
 Semifinal One:  Top two in Race One and Race Two
 Semifinal Two:  Top two in Race Three and Race Four
 Finals:  Top two in Semifinal One and Semifinal Two
 Lane choice determined by times in previous round.  In first round, lane choice determined by fastest times.
 Drivers who advance in Rounds One and Two will receive 20 points for each round advancement.
 In Round Three, the winner of the race will be declared the race winner and will collect 40 points.  The runner-up will receive 20 points.  Third and fourth place drivers will be credited as semifinal losers.

Notable events
Veteran Pro Stock driver Jeg Coughlin Jr. announced he is "stepping away" from the Pro Stock class for the 2011 season, electing to race instead in Sportsman classes. "We took most of 2006 off just to kind of have a break from it all," he said in his press release. "We did a lot of high-dollar bracket races and select Lucas Oil Sportsman Series events here and there with no particular schedule in mind. We kind of just raced when we wanted to and it was a lot of fun. That is the direction I am heading now."  Coughlin expects to spend more time with his school-age son Jeg Coughlin III at golf tournaments.

NASCAR Sprint Cup Series driver Kurt Busch (#22 Dodge Charger) obtained an NHRA Pro Stock license and debuted in competition at the Tire Kingdom Gatornationals in March, held during the NASCAR winter off-week.

Ashley Force Hood sat out the 2011 season, as she and husband Dan Hood were expecting their first child.  John Force Racing mechanic Mike Neff, who raced from late 2007 after replacing the late Eric Medlen after his fatal crash until 2009, returned to drive the Ford Mustang. Neff won the 2009 Auto Club Finals in his last start before returning to tuning John Force's car.

At the Fram/Autolite NHRA Nationals in Sonoma, CA, John Force qualified at the top of the Funny Car ladder. This gave Force 139 No. 1 qualifications for major events, besting the previous record holder, Pro Stock driver Warren Johnson, who holds 138 No. 1 qualifications as of 31 June 2011.

Two days after the 2011 season ended, six-time champion Kenny Bernstein announced his retirement from drag racing. Just six days later, 2011 Top Fuel champion Del Worsham also retired, although he did win 8 races.

References

External links
 Official website
 Official NHRA Drag Racing Podcasts
 Drag Race Central The Latest NHRA News and Analysis

NHRA Camping World Drag Racing Series
NHRA Full Throttle